The Accompanist (French: L'Accompagnatrice) is a 1992 French film directed by Claude Miller from a novel by Nina Berberova, and starring Romane Bohringer, Yelena Safonova and Richard Bohringer.

Plot 
In 1942 Nazi-occupied Paris, a young and impoverished accompanist named Sophie Vasseur gets a job with famed singer Irene Brice. As Irene's possessive husband and manager, Charles, a businessman collaborating with the Nazis, wrestles with his conscience, the highly impressionable Sophie becomes obsessed with Irene, taking on the role of maid as well as accompanist, living life vicariously through Irene's triumphs and affairs, especially romantic. When Irene relocates to London, Sophie goes along, much to the discomfort of Charles.

Cast 
 Romane Bohringer : Sophie Vasseur
 Richard Bohringer : Charles Brice
 Yelena Safonova : Irène Brice
 Samuel Labarthe : Jacques Fabert
 Julien Rassam : Benoît Weizman
 Bernard Verley : Jacques Ceniat
 Nelly Borgeaud : Madame Vasseur
 Claude Rich : The minister
 Sacha Briquet : Dignitary

References

External links 

1992 films
1992 drama films
1990s French-language films
Films directed by Claude Miller
Films about classical music and musicians
French World War II films
Sony Pictures Classics films
1990s French films